The 1985–86 Serie C1 was the eighth edition of Serie C1, the third highest league in the Italian football league system.

Overview

Serie C1/A
Eighteen teams competed in Serie C1/A and Parma won the championship. It was decided that Parma and Modena would be promoted to Serie B. Pavia, Varese, Sanremese were relegated to Serie C2.

Serie C1/B
Also contested by 18 teams, the Serie C1/B champions were Messina.

League standings

Serie C1/A

Serie C1/B

External links
Italy Championship 1985/86 at RSSSF

Serie C1 seasons
3
Italy